Gornja Trstenica is a village in central Croatia, in the municipality of Gvozd, Sisak-Moslavina County. It is connected by the D6 highway.

History

Demographics
According to the 2011 census, the village of Gornja Trstenica has 88 inhabitants. This represents 29.43% of its pre-war population according to the 1991 census.

According to the 1991 census, 99.00% of the village population were ethnic Serbs (296/299),  0.33% were ethnic Croats (1/299), while 0.67% were of other ethnic origin (2/299).

Notable natives and residents

References 

Populated places in Sisak-Moslavina County
Serb communities in Croatia